A parka is a type of coat.

Parka may also refer to:
Parka (plant), Silurian plant genus
Parka (band), a German indie rock band
The Reaper (2013 film), a Mexican documentary film, originally released as La parka

Personas
Parka (beaver) a girl mascot
La Parka, the Mexican masked profession wrestler, Adolfo Tapia
La Parka II, a Mexican masked professional wrestler
Super Parka, the Mexican masked profession wrestler, Ramón Ibarra Banda

See also
Parca (disambiguation)